The 1970 Individual Speedway World Championship was the 25th edition of the official World Championship to determine the world champion rider.

Ivan Mauger became the first rider to win the title in three consecutive years, his five ride 15 point maximum took him to third in the all time list behind Ove Fundin and Barry Briggs. The Poles Paweł Waloszek and Antoni Woryna took silver and bronze respectively in their home nation at the Olympic Stadium.

Format changes
The format of the Championship changed again for the 1970 event. This time the Polish riders were allowed six places in the World Final to be held in Poland. All other nations had to go through the European Final route to provide the remaining 10 riders for the World Final.

First round
British/Commonwealth Qualifying - 16 to British/Commonwealth Final
Scandinavian Qualifying - 16 to Nordic Final
Continental Qualifying - 16 to Continental Final

British/Commonwealth Qualifying

Swedish Qualifying

Continental Qualifying

Second round
British/Commonwealth Final - 8 to British/Commonwealth/Nordic final
Nordic Final -  8 to British/Commonwealth/Nordic final

British/Commonwealth Final
June 9, 1970
 London, West Ham Stadium
 First 8 to British Nordic Final

Nordic Final
 June 4, 1970
 Eskilstuna
 First 8 to British-Nordic Final

Third round
British/Nordic Final - 8 to European Final
Continental Final - 8 to European Final

British Nordic Final
July 1, 1970
 Coventry, Brandon Stadium
 First 8 to European Final

Continental Final
June 2, 1970
 Abensberg
 First 8 to European Final

Fourth round
European Final - 10 to World Final
Polish Qualifications - 6 to World Final

European Final
July 20, 1970
 Leningrad
 First 8 to World Final

Polish Qualifications
 Marked in green to World Final

World Final
September 6, 1970
 Wrocław, Olympic Stadium

References

1970
World Individual
World
Speedway competitions in Poland